Leeds School Centred Initial Teacher Training ( SCITT) is a collaboration of schools in England from the north of Leeds and Bradford together with Leeds Trinity University which offers teacher training at the secondary level.  It offers courses in design and technology (including food technology), ICT, music and science.

History 
Leeds SCITT developed as a bottom-up initiative, with its origins in 2002 at a departmental level.  Design technology teachers in two schools initially considered ways of supporting local teacher training and teacher recruitment into their curriculum area and investigated the School Centred Initial Teacher Training model.  Subsequently, other schools were approached and the group sought the involvement of Leeds Trinity University, as the regional HEI with whom they had a close working relationship.  The first group of teachers completed the Leeds SCITT programme in July 2005.

Organisation 
Leeds SCITT is based on a combination of four lead and a number of associate schools.  Lead schools are responsible for initial subject application tuition and teaching placement training. Associate schools provide opportunities for complementary and contrasting school-based training. The schools in the SCITT include denominational and non-denominational schools; inner-city, suburban and semi-rural; and 11-16 and 11-19 age ranges.  The combination of lead and associate schools enables trainees to work with trainees from diverse cultural and socio-economic backgrounds.

External links 
Leeds SCITT

Teacher training programs
Education in Leeds